Skrimshire is a surname. Notable people with the surname include:

 Fenwick Skrimshire (1774–1855), naturalist and physician who certified John Clare as mad
 Reg Skrimshire (1878–1930), Welsh rugby player
 Baroness Skrimshire of Quarter

See also
 Scrimshaw (disambiguation)